Lipan Apache are a band of Apache, a Southern Athabaskan Indigenous people, who have lived in the Southwest and Southern Plains for centuries. At the time of European and African contact, they lived in New Mexico, Colorado, Oklahoma, Texas, and northern Mexico. Historically, they were the easternmost band of Apache. Early adopters of horse culture and peyotism, the Lipan Apache hunted bison and farmed.

Many Lipan Apache descendants today are enrolled members of the Mescalero Apache Tribe in New Mexico. Other Lipan descendants are enrolled with the Tonkawa Tribe of Indians of Oklahoma and Apache Tribe of Oklahoma, also known as the Kiowa Apache or Plains Apache. Other Lipan Apache descendants live in Texas, New Mexico, Oklahoma, Arizona, and northern Mexico.

Language 

Lipan Apache is a Southern Athabaskan language, considered to be closely related to the Jicarilla Apache language. In 1981, two elders on the Mescalero Apache Reservation were fluent Lipan speakers.

Name 
Their first recorded name is Ypandes. Captain Felipe de Rábago y Terán first wrote the term Lipanes in 1761. The terms Eastern Apache and Texas Apache can also include them as well as the Chiricahua and Mescalero.

Querecho, a Navajo name for the Apache, was adopted by early Spanish colonists. Spanish chroniclers recorded their names as Achos, Chipaines, Conejeros, and Rio Colorados (or Canadian River Apaches). The Spanish recorded the Tucubante as being a band of Lipan Apache.

History
Southern Athabascans, the Apache and Navajo, had settled in New Mexico and western Texas at least by 1300 CE. Precontact Plains Apache first lived along the Canadian River, followed by the Lipan Apache. They traded with Pueblo peoples to the west and Caddoan peoples to the east. Pictographs at Hueco Tanks may be associated with the Apache.

16th and 17th centuries 

Ancestors of the Lipan Apache lived along the Canadian River when the Expedition of Francisco Vásquez de Coronado traveled there in 1541 and were still in the region when Diego de Vargas arrived in 1694. Historians believe the Teya Indians of the Texas Panhandle likely merged into the Lipan.

Lipan Apache obtained horses from the Spanish by 1608 and adopted a nomadic lifestyle. They were excellent horsemen and freely raided settlements. Throughout the 17th century, Spaniards raided Apache communities for slaves. The Acho, a branch of Lipan, fought with Taos Pueblo and Picuris Pueblo people against the Spanish in the 1620 Pueblo Revolt.

In 1684, Spanish colonists completed the Mission San Francisco de los Julimes near Presidio, Texas, to serve Jumano, Julime, and neighboring tribes. These tribes taught the peyote ceremony to the Tonkawa and Lipan, who in turn, shared it with the Comanches, Mescalero Apaches, and Plains Apaches. In the 1860s, Spanish chroniclers wrote that some Lipan Apache lived near the Gulf Coast and adopted lifeways of the neighboring Karankawa.

18th century 

By 1700, Lipan had settled across southern Texas and into Coahuila, Mexico. They still lived in agricultural settlements, where they farmed indigenous crops such as pumpkins, corn, and beans, as well as watermelons, introduced from Africa. French explorer Bénard de La Harpe encounter the Lipan Apache near present-day Latimer County, Oklahoma, in 1719.

The Lipan were first mentioned in Spanish records in 1718 when they raided Spanish settlements in San Antonio. They frequently raided Spanish supply trains traveling from Coahuila to the newly established San Antonio.

In 1749, two Lipan Apache chiefs joined other Apache leaders in signing one of the earliest recorded peace treaties with Spain in San Antonio. Some Lipan Apache people settled northwest of San Antonio during the mid-18th century.

Spanish colonists built forts and missions near Lipan settlements. A mission on the San Sabá River was completed in 1757 but destroyed by the Comanche and the Wichita. That same year, the Lipan Apache fought the Hasinais, a band of Caddo people. The Lipan participated in a Spanish expedition against the Wichita and Comanche in 1759 but were defeated in the Battle of the Twin Villages. Missions established for the Lipan at Candelaria and San Lorenzo were destroyed by the Comanche in 1767.

By 1767, all Lipan had completely deserted the Spanish missions. In the same year, Marquis of Rubí started a policy of Lipan extermination after a 1764 smallpox epidemic had decimated the tribe.

19th century 

In the early 19th century, Lipan Apache primarily lived in south and west Texas, south of the Colorado River to the Gulf of Mexico and east to the Rio Grande. To resist their enemies the Comanche and the Mexicans, the Lipan Apache allied with the Republic of Texas in the 1830s. They served as scouts to the Texas Militia during the Texas Revolution of 1835–36. 

Upon joining the United States in 1846, Texas owned massive war debts and used land sales to raise funds. The state of Texas left almost no land to American Indians. Texas established the Brazos Reservation in 1854 but then forced the tribes to relocate to Indian Territory by 1859.

In 1855, some Lipan Apache joined the Brazos Reservation; however, most did not. Some joined the Plains Apache in Oklahoma; others joined the Mescalero in New Mexico, and others fled to Mexico. Anglo-Americans drove the Lipan Apache into Coahuila in the 1840s and 1850s.

In 1869, Mexican troops from Monterrey were brought to Zaragosa to eliminate the Lipan Apache, who were blamed for causing trouble. Chief Magoosh (Lipan, ca. 1830–1900) led his band from Texas and joined the Mescalero Apache on the Mescalero Reservation in 1870. Troops attacked many Lipan camps; survivors fled to the Mescaleros in New Mexico. From 1875 to 1876, United States Army troops undertook joint military campaigns with the Mexican Army to eliminate the Lipan from the state of Coahuila in northern Mexico. In 1879, a group of 17 Lipan settled near Fort Griffin, Texas, but were in 1884, they forcibly removed to Indian Territory, where they joined the Tonkawa. 

In 1881, a large campaign by Mexican Army’s Díaz division (assisted by US troops) forced all Lipan out of Coahuila and into Chihuahua.

20th century 
In October 1903, 19 surviving Lipan Apache who fled Texas into Coahuila were taken to northwest Chihuahua and kept as prisoners of war until 1905. They were released to the Mescalero Reservation.

Population 
Ethnographer James Mooney estimated that there were 500 Lipan Apache in 1690. Morris Opler estimated that the population was around 3,000 to 4,000; He estimated a total of 6,000 in 1700. In 1805, three bands of Lipan men were estimated to have been 750, while the 1910 census only listed 28 Lipan Apache people.

21st century 
Lipan Apache descendants are enrolled with the Mescalero Apache Tribe in New Mexico, Tonkawa Tribe in Oklahoma, and the Apache Tribe of Oklahoma. Other individual descendants live in Texas, Coahuila, and surrounding areas. 

Several unrecognized tribes in Texas identify as being descendants of Lipan Apache. These include:
 Cuelgahen Nde Lipan Apache of Texas in Three Rivers, Texas
 Lipan Apache Band of Texas in Brackettville, Texas
 Lipan Apache Nation of Texas, also known as the Kuné Tsa Nde Band of the Lipan Apache Nation of Texas, in San Antonio, Texas
 Lipan Apache Tribe of Texas in McAllen, Texas.

The Texas groups are not federally recognized. The National Congress of American Indians identifies Lipan Apache Tribe of Texas as being a state-recognized tribe, while the National Conference of State Legislatures does not. The Texas Legislature has passed numerous congratulatory resolutions, honoring the Lipan Apache Band of Texas and the Lipan Apache Tribe of Texas; however, "Resolutions are statements of opinions and, unlike bills, do not have the force of law." In January 2021, Texas Senate Bill 274 to formally recognize the Lipan Apache Tribe of Texas died in committee. Texas has "no legal mechanism to recognize tribes."

Leaders 

 Bigotes, "Mustached One" (mid-18th century), left Texas in 1751 and crossed with his Kuné tsa the Rio Grande into Coahuila. About this date they lived along the Rio Escondido and Rio San Rodrigo in Coahuila
 Casimiro (18th c.), chief of one band in southern Texas, perhaps of the Ha´didla`Ndé
 Cavezon, "Big Head" (unknown – ca. 1780), chief of the Ndáwe qóhä, a powerful band of the San Saba River near the upper Nueces River
 Coco, chief of the Cannesi N'de of Louisiana, ca. 1810–1860
 Costalites (ca. 1820 – 1873), chief of one band, that was wandering from Coahuila into southwest Texas
 Cuelgas de Castro (ca. 1792 – ca. 1844), chief of the Tche shä in the territory of San Antonio across the Rio Grande in Tamaulipas
 Flacco (ca. 1790 – ca. 1850), chief of the Kóke metcheskó lähä east and southeast of San Antonio)
 Magoosh, Ma´uish (ca. 1830 – 1900), chief of the Tsis Nde of southeastern Texas, because of a severe epidemic one part of this band went to Zaragosa in Coahuila, the other part of Magoosh took refuge by the Mescalero and accompanied them in 1870 onto the Mescalero Reservation)
 Poca Ropa, "Few or scant clothes" (ca. 1750 – ca. 1790), chief of the Tcha shka-ó´zhäye along the lower Pecos River
 Yolcna Pocarropa (ca. 1820 – unknown), chief of several bands of the Tcha shka-ó´zhäye in western Texas, in 1830 he led them across the Rio Grande into Tamaulipas in Mexico downriver of Laredo

Notes

References

Further reading 
 Carlisle, JD. Dissertation. "Spanish Relations with the Apache Nations East of the Rio Grande". The University of North Texas, May 2001
 Dunn, William E. "Missionary activities among the eastern Apaches previous to the founding of the San Sabá missions." Texas State Historical Association Quarterly, 15.
 Dunn, William E. "The Apache mission on the San Sabá River, its founding and its failure." Texas State Historical Association Quarterly, 16.
 Opler, Morris E. (1936). "The kinship systems of the southern Athabaskan-speaking tribes." American Anthropologist, 38, 620-633.
 Opler, Morris E. (1938). "The use of peyote by the Carrizo and the Lipan Apache." American Anthropologist, 40 (2).
 Opler, Morris E. (1940). Myths and legends of the Lipan Apache. Memoirs of the American Folk-Lore Society (Vol. 36). New York: American Folk-Lore Society, J. J. Augustin Publisher.
 Opler, Morris E. (1945). "The Lipan Apache Death Complex and Its Extensions." Southwestern Journal of Anthropology. 1: 122-141.
 Opler, Morris E. (1959). "Component, assemblage, and theme in cultural integration and differentiation." American Anthropologist, 61 (6), 955-964.
 Opler, Morris E. (1968). "Remuneration to supernaturals and man in Apachean ceremonialism." Ethnology, 7 (4), 356-393.
 Opler, Morris E. (1975). "Problems in Apachean cultural history, with special reference to the Lipan Apache." Anthropological Quarterly, 48 (3), 182-192.
 Opler, Morris E. (2001). Lipan Apache. In Handbook of North American Indians: The Plains (pp. 941–952). Washington, D.C.: Smithsonian Institution.

External links
 Mescalero Apache Tribe, official website
 Lipan Apache Band of Texas, official website
 Lipan Apache Tribe of Texas, official website
 Spanish Relations with the Apache Nations East of the Río Grande.
 Treaty between the Republic of Texas and the Lipan and other Indian tribes, 1844
 Apache Relations in Texas, 1718-1750
 Missionary Activities among the Eastern Apaches Previous to the Founding of the San Saba Mission
 The Apache Mission on the San Sabá River; Its Founding and Failure

Apache tribes
Native American tribes in New Mexico
Native American tribes in Oklahoma
Native American tribes in Texas
Plains tribes
Unrecognized tribes in the United States
Indigenous peoples in Mexico